John Maxwell (born July 12, 1944) is a writer and performer from Jackson, Mississippi.

Career 
Maxwell is best known for his portrayal of William Faulkner in Oh, Mr. Faulkner, Do You Write?, a one-man theatrical piece co-written with Tom Dupree. Maxwell has performed this play steadily since its world premiere at Jackson's New Stage Theatre in 1981. It appeared as a film, directed by Jimbo Barnett, in 2006, and was released on DVD in 2008.

Maxwell spoke at the May 1, 2005, rededication of Rowan Oak, William Faulkner's home in Oxford, Mississippi, that is operated as a museum by the University of Mississippi.

In 2006, he received the "Best Actor" Award at the Atlanta Film Festival for Oh, Mr Faulkner, Do You Write?.

Filmography

Film

Television

External links

John Maxwell, The Mississippi Writers and Musicians Project

American male stage actors
American male film actors
20th-century American dramatists and playwrights
1944 births
Living people